Budi Luhur University is a private university in Jakarta, Indonesia. Founded on 1 April 1979 by Dr. Djaetun HS.. This university is now running under Budi Luhur Cakti Education Foundation (Yayasan Pendidikan Budi Luhur Cakti).

History 

The founding of Budi Luhur University was started by the foundation on 1 April 1979. Started as Computer Science Academy (Akademi Ilmu Komputer) in 1979. Computer Science Academy was regarded as one of the earliest university specialised in computer science in Indonesia.

Budi Luhur University (UBL) was formed from the amalgamation of Computer and Informatics Management High School, Economic Science High School, Engineering High School, and Political and Social Science High School of Budi Luhur on 7 June 2002.

Budi Luhur University mandated its students to participate on Community Service Programme (KKN) since 2019.

Budi Luhur University in association with  Sepuluh November Institute of Technology developing BLITS electric rally raid car which already toured across Indonesia and will participate in Dakar Rally in the future.

Faculty and Academy 

Budi Luhur University has five faculties and an academy with bachelor's degree (S1) and 3-year diploma degree (D3)  and accredited by National Accreditation Body of High School (BAN PT). Budi Luhur University also has post-graduate programme for master's degree (S2).

Faculty of Information and Technology (FTI) 
FTI has three specialisations for bachelor's degree and two specialisations for 3-year diploma.

Bachelor's degree

 Informatics Engineering
 Information Systems
 Computer Systems

3-year diploma

 Informatics Management
 Computerisation of Accountancy

Post-graduate programme (master's degree)

 Master of Computer Science

Faculty of Communication Science (FIKOM) 
FIKOM has two specialisations for bachelor's degree.

 Communication Science
 Visual Communication Design

Post-graduate programme (master's degree)

 Master of Communication Science

Faculty of Economics and Business (FEB) 
FEB has two specialisations for bachelor's degree.

 Marketing
 Accountancy

Post-graduate programmes (master's degree)

 Master of Accountancy
 Master of Management

Faculty of Engineering (FT) 
FT has two specialisations for bachelor's degree.

 Architecture 
 Electrical Engineering

Faculty of Social and Political Science (FISIP) 
FISIP has two specialisations for bachelor's degree.

 International Relations
 Criminology

Academy of Secretary (ASTRI) 
ASTRI has a specialisation for 3-year diploma.

 Secretary

Special Programmes 

 International Programmes with partner universities
 Executive Class
 Jakarta Broadcasting School (JBS)
 Budi Luhur Learning Centre (BLLC)

References

External links 

  Official website
  Official Academy of Secretary website

Universities in Jakarta
Private universities and colleges in Jakarta